Rhamphomyia morenae is a species of dance flies, in the fly family Empididae. It is included in the subgenus Holoclera of the genus Rhamphomyia.

References

Rhamphomyia
Asilomorph flies of Europe
Insects described in 1899